Harold's Cross Stadium was a greyhound racing stadium in Harold's Cross, Dublin, owned and operated by the Irish Greyhound Board.

Facilities included a grandstand restaurant, carvery, a number of bars, totalisator betting and seating.

Racing took place every Tuesday and Friday evening and race distances were 325, 525, 550, 570, and 750 yards and the feature competitions at the track were the Corn Cuchulainn, the Puppy Derby and the Grand National.

The stadium closed on 13 February 2017 due to financial constraints at the owner. The proceeds from the sale were proposed be used to help pay a €20.3 million debt incurred from the construction of Limerick Greyhound Stadium.

Football
The stadium was used over the years by five football teams who were competing in the League of Ireland:
 Brideville played there for eleven seasons from 1929/30-1931/32 and from 1935/36-1942/43
 Dolphins played there from 1932/33-1933/34
 Transport played there from 1951/52-1961/62, a total of eleven seasons.
 Shelbourne played at the stadium from 1975/76-1976/77 and again from 1982/83-1988/89 before moving to Tolka Park 
 St Patrick's Athletic were the last League of Ireland club to play there regularly, from 1989/90 up to November 1993, while work was being done to its Richmond Park home.

Harold's Cross has hosted a number of notable matches. It staged one League of Ireland Cup Final when Limerick City beat St. Patrick's Athletic 2–0 in the 1992/93 decider, whilst the last League of Ireland match ever played in Harold's Cross was a home match for Galway United. On the final weekend of the 1993/94 season, there was no available pitch in Galway due to persistent torrential rain for their match with Shelbourne so the game was switched to Harold's Cross. Shels won the match 5–2 with Barry O'Connor grabbing a hat-trick.

Speedway
The stadium was used for speedway racing in 1928.

Greyhound racing

Origins and opening
On 13 February 1928 a new Irish company was registered called the Dublin Greyhound and Sports Association Ltd. The nominal capital was £25,000 in shares of £1 and the directors were J.B Fraser a timber merchant, John J Flood (retired public official), Walter Butler (architect), Edward Teehan (gentleman) and John McEntagart (motor engineer). Together they would introduce the second greyhound racing track to Dublin in the form of Harold's Cross close to the centre of Dublin (the first was Shelbourne Park).

It became the third greyhound racing venue in Ireland following Shelbourne Park and Celtic Park in Belfast. The opening night was on 10 April 1928 with the first race scheduled for 8 pm. The Irish Times advertised the fact that there was accommodation for 40,000 people and car parking for 1,000 cars. The Riordan family formed the first management with John superseded by his son John F.

In 1928 Harolds Cross introduced a competition that would become the modern day Irish Greyhound Derby, the race was unofficial because Harolds Cross decided to run this 'National Derby' without consulting the Irish racing fraternity. This was a practice they would continue to do until the formation of classic races in 1932.

Pre-war history 
In 1929 Mick the Miller won the Spring Cup competition here over 525 yards and then finished runner up in the Stayers Cup over 600 yards. The Irish Coursing Club issued a new list of classic races in 1932 and controversy followed because Harolds Cross was given the Oaks and not the Derby. Shelbourne had been given the premier event which did not go down well based on the fact that they had introduced the event. One year later and Harolds Cross were furious that Shelbourne were issued the race again. In a meeting Mr Tynan representing the track, had pointed out that the previous year Paddy O’Donoghue had promised that they could hold the event in 1933. I.C.C chairman John Bruton explained that they could not cancel a ruling by the club already made. Tynan stormed out and Harolds Cross refused to run any classics or their qualifying races and threatened to run their own Irish Championship. Finally in 1934 they were granted permission to run the Derby as long as they contributed a minimum of £100 towards the event. The ICC added a further £50 and it was also agreed that Shelbourne and Harolds Cross would run the competition in alternate years.

The first star of the track was a black bitch called Nanny Goosegog owned by the legendary Arthur Doc Callanan who happened to be the track vet as well in the early days of racing at Harolds Cross. The March 1938 whelp won 37 of her 38 races at the Harolds Cross but because some of these were handicap races the bitch did not set any official records. After 20 consecutive wins she was beaten by Lucky House who received 11 yards, another 17 consecutive victories followed so it is easy to see why she was Dublin's first superstar.

In 1943 the Puppy Derby was inaugurated here. One year later the track became the first in Ireland to introduce automatic starting traps. 'Doc' Callanan had suffered from ill health in 1945 and died aged 51; Harolds Cross introduced a race in his memory called the Callanan Cup.

Post-war history 
Spanish Battleship won the first and last of his Derby titles in 1953 and 1955 respectively and the 1955 edition saw the stadium overwhelmed by crowds attempting to get a look at final.

The Bord na gCon funded a new totalisator system at the track in 1960. The Derby was last run at the track in 1967, when it was won by Russian Gun. Rumours had surfaced that developers might purchase the track so the Irish Greyhound Board acted quickly and bought Harolds Cross in 1970 to quash any future re-development plans.

The Corn Cuchulainn for stayers was another major event introduced to the track in 1961 and in 1977 the track went ahead with considerable improvements that included a new stand, restaurant and other facilities. The 1978 running of the Callanan Cup and Oaks did not take place at the Cross with the latter switching to Shelbourne. Stability followed with established races taking centre stage except for the Oaks which would eventually be held at Shelbourne permanently. George Deegan became Racing Manager as the track raced on Tuesday, Thursday and Saturday nights.

Despite the stadium being in the hands of the Irish Greyhound Board and Racing Manager Deegan providing security with his long tenure the Dublin track was subject once again to rumours in the early nineties. There were strong indications coming from some quarters that Harolds Cross would close to ease the burden of costs on the IGB. Luckily business began to grow after a tough period of trading and the rumours went away. The Grand National had been held here since 2001, the second time the track has hosted the event following the previous spell during the 1930s.

In 2010 Racing Manager Billy Bell decided to join Mullingar Greyhound Stadium as their Racing Manager leaving Harolds Cross looking for a replacement. Coincidentally Derek Frehill (part of the Mullingar management & former RM there) was the one to fill the gap switching paces when Bell left. The trading of places took place after the Puppy Derby final.

Sale
Towards the end of 2014 the Irish Greyhound Board decided to sell the stadium. It was considered that by doing so the debts of the IGB could be drastically reduced. The idea was to transfer all Dublin operations to Shelbourne Park but the decision did not sit well with those involved with Harolds Cross and many others in Irish racing. Even some at Shelbourne expressed concern that they relied on Harolds Cross as a feeder stadium.

The move was confirmed on 13 February 2017, and all IGB operations have since ceased.

Competitions
Corn Cuchulainn
Puppy Derby
Grand National
Irish Greyhound Derby
Oaks
Callanan Cup

Track records
At closing

Former

References

Harolds Cross
Shelbourne F.C.
St Patrick's Athletic F.C.
Sports venues in Dublin (city)
Association football venues in the Republic of Ireland
Transport F.C.
Association football venues in County Dublin
1928 establishments in Ireland
2017 disestablishments in Ireland
Defunct greyhound racing venues in Ireland
Greyhound racing in Dublin (city)
Dolphin F.C.